The 2010 Asian Cycling Championships took place at the Zayed Velodrome in Sharjah, United Arab Emirates from 9 to 17 April 2010.

Medal summary

Road

Men

Women

Track

Men

Women

Medal table

References
 Road Results
 Results - Road
 Results - Men's Track
 Results - Women's Track

External links
 Japan Cycling Federation
 Korea Cycling Federation

Asia
Asia
Cycling
Asian Cycling Championships
2010 in Asian sport
International cycle races hosted by the United Arab Emirates